Jason Chang (born 18 May 1944) is a Taiwanese/Singaporean billionaire, currently the chairman of Taiwan-based Advanced Semiconductor Engineering (ASE). On the Forbes 2020 list of the world's billionaires, he was ranked #836 with a net worth of US$2.5 billion.

In September 2015, Chang received a Semiconductor Equipment and Materials International SEMI Award, which recognized his "significant achievements in the development and commercialization of copper wire in the IC assembly process".

Personal life 
Jason Chang's hometown is Wenzhou. Chang has three children: Danielle, Rutherford, and Madeline. They followed a creative path as their mother, Ching Ping Chang, was an interior designer and artistic.Chang, Bee-Shyuan, "Rallying Around a Bowl of Rice", The New York Times, April 16, 2013

Recognition 
In December 2013, Chang publicly apologized for water pollution caused by untreated wastewater issuing from an ASE plant in southern Taiwan, following a TW$600,000 (US$20,300) fine earlier that month from Kaohsiung City Government.

In November 2018, Chang was awarded an Honorary Doctor of Engineering from National Sun Yat-sen University (NSYSU).

References

1944 births
Living people
Singaporean billionaires
Taiwanese billionaires
Taiwanese people from Shanghai
Place of birth missing (living people)